The Ontario Open was a golf tournament on the PGA Tour that was played in 1961 and 1962 at the Whispering Lakes Golf Course in Ontario, California, which opened in 1956.

The 1961 tournament, played from October 12–15, was won by 42-year-old Eric Monti of Los Angeles, when he sank an 8-foot birdie putt on the second extra hole of a three-way sudden death playoff with George Bayer and Bobby Nichols. The winners share was $2,800 out of a total purse of $20,000.

In the 1962 tournament, played October 18–21, Al Geiberger won his first PGA Tour event by one stroke over five other golfers. He won $3,500 from a $27,500 purse.

Winners

References

Former PGA Tour events
Golf in California